Koshimbi is a village in the Thane district of Maharashtra, India. It is located in the Bhiwandi taluka. It lies on the Mumbai Nashik Expressway.

Demographics 

According to the 2011 census of India, Koshimbi has 307 households with 1409 people (including 704 males and 705 females).

References 

Villages in Bhiwandi taluka